Felice Aisha Chow (born 15 June 1977 ) is a Trinidad and Tobago competitive rower.

She was the first athlete to ever represent Trinidad and Tobago in rowing at the Olympics and competed at the 2016 Summer Olympics in Rio de Janeiro and at the 2020 Summer Olympics in Tokyo, in the women's single sculls.

She is a 2018 CAC Games silver medalist and 2019 PanAm silver medalist (women's single sculls).

References

External links

1977 births
Living people
Trinidad and Tobago female rowers
Olympic rowers of Trinidad and Tobago
Rowers at the 2016 Summer Olympics
Rowers at the 2020 Summer Olympics
Pan American Games medalists in rowing
Pan American Games silver medalists for Trinidad and Tobago
Rowers at the 2019 Pan American Games
Medalists at the 2019 Pan American Games
Sportspeople from Port of Spain